Manikganj-2 is a constituency represented in the Jatiya Sangsad (National Parliament) of Bangladesh since 2014 by Momtaz Begum of the Awami League.

Boundaries 
The constituency encompasses Harirampur and Singair upazilas, and four union parishads of Manikganj Sadar Upazila: Bhararia, Hati Para, and Putail.

History 
The constituency was created in 1984 from a Dhaka constituency when the former Dhaka District was split into six districts: Manikganj, Munshiganj, Dhaka, Gazipur, Narsingdi, and Narayanganj.

Ahead of the 2008 general election, the Election Commission redrew constituency boundaries to reflect population changes revealed by the 2001 Bangladesh census. The 2008 redistricting  altered the boundaries of the constituency.

Members of Parliament

Elections

Elections in the 2010s 
Momtaz Begum was elected unopposed in the 2014 general election after opposition parties withdrew their candidacies in a boycott of the election.

Elections in the 2000s 

Harunur Rashid Khan Monno stood for two seats in the 2001 general election: Manikganj-2 and Manikganj-3. After winning both, he chose to represent Manikganj-3 and quit Manikganj-2, triggering a by-election in Manikganj-2. Independent candidate Samsuddin Ahmed was elected in a November 2001 by-election.

Elections in the 1990s

References

External links
 

Parliamentary constituencies in Bangladesh
Manikganj District